HM Revenue and Customs (His Majesty's Revenue and Customs, or HMRC) is a non-ministerial department of the UK Government responsible for the collection of taxes, the payment of some forms of state support, the administration of other regulatory regimes including the national minimum wage and the issuance of national insurance numbers. HMRC was formed by the merger of the Inland Revenue and HM Customs and Excise, which took effect on 18 April 2005. The department's logo is the St Edward's Crown enclosed within a circle. Prior to the Queen's death on 8 September 2022, the department was known as Her Majesty's Revenue and Customs and has since been amended to reflect the change of monarch.

Departmental responsibilities
The department is responsible for the administration and collection of direct taxes including Income Tax, Corporation Tax, Capital Gains Tax (CGT) and Inheritance Tax (IHT), indirect taxes including Value Added Tax (VAT), excise duties and Stamp Duty Land Tax (SDLT), and environmental taxes such as Air Passenger Duty and the Climate Change Levy. Other aspects of the department's responsibilities include National Insurance Contributions (NIC), the distribution of Child Benefit and some other forms of state support including the Child Trust Fund, payments of Tax Credits, enforcement of the National Minimum Wage, administering anti-money laundering registrations for Money Service Businesses and collection and publication of the trade-in-goods statistics. Responsibility for the protection of the UK's borders passed to the UK Border Agency within the Home Office on 1 April 2008 and then to UK Border Force and the National Crime Agency in 2013.

Powers of officers
HMRC is a law enforcement agency which has a strong cadre of criminal investigators responsible for investigating Serious Organised Fiscal Crime.  This includes all of the previous HMCE criminal work (other than drug trafficking but used to include this up until 2008) such as tobacco, alcohol, and oils smuggling.  They have aligned their previous Customs and Excise powers to tackle previous Inland Revenue criminal offences. They are responsible for seizing (or preventing the loss of) billions of stolen pounds of HMG's revenue. Their skills and resources include the full range of intrusive and covert surveillance and they are a senior partner in the Organised Crime Partnership Board.

HMRC criminal investigation officers have wide-ranging powers of arrest, entry, search and detention. HMRC have the power to apply for orders requiring information to be produced; apply for and execute search warrants; make arrests; search suspects and premises following arrest; and recover criminal assets through the Proceeds of Crime Act 2002.

The main power, under section 138 of the Customs and Excise Management Act 1979 (as amended by section 114 of the Police and Criminal Evidence Act 1984) is to arrest anyone who has committed, or whom the officer has reasonable grounds to suspect has committed, any offence under the Customs and Excise Acts as well as related fraud offences.

On 30 June 2006, under the authority of the new Labour home secretary, John Reid, extensive new powers were given to HMRC. Under chairman Sir David Varney, a new Criminal Taxes Unit of senior tax investigators was created to target suspected fraudsters and criminal gangs. To disrupt and clamp down on criminal activity. This HMRC/CTU would pursue suspects in the same way the US Internal Revenue Service caught out Al Capone on tax evasion. These new powers included the ability to impose penalties without needing to prove the guilt of suspected criminals; extra powers to use sophisticated surveillance techniques, and for the first time, to have the same ability as customs officers to monitor suspects and arrest them. On 19 July 2006, the executive chairman of HMRC, Sir David Varney resigned.

HMRC is also listed under parts of the British government which contribute to intelligence collection, analysis and assessment. Their prosecution cases may be coordinated with the police or the Crown Prosecution Service.

History 
The merger of the Inland Revenue and HM Customs & Excise was announced by then chancellor of the Exchequer Gordon Brown in the budget on 17 March 2004. The name for the new department and its first executive chairman, David Varney, were announced on 9 May 2004. Varney joined the nascent department in September 2004, and staff started moving from Somerset House and New Kings Beam House into HMRC's new headquarters building at 100 Parliament Street in Whitehall on 21 November 2004.

The planned new department was announced formally in the Queen's Speech of 2004 and a bill, the Commissioners for Revenue and Customs Bill, was introduced into the House of Commons on 24 September 2004, and received royal assent as the Commissioners for Revenue and Customs Act 2005 on 7 April 2005. The Act also creates a Revenue and Customs Prosecutions Office (RCPO) responsible for the prosecution of all Revenue and Customs cases.

The old Inland Revenue and Customs & Excise departments had very different historical bases, internal cultures and legal powers. The merger was described by the Financial Times on 9 July 2004, as "mating the C&E terrier with the IR retriever". For an interim period officers of HMRC are empowered to use existing Inland Revenue powers in relation to matters within the remit of the old Inland Revenue (such as income tax, stamp duty and tax credits) and existing Customs powers in relation to matters within the remit of the old Customs & Excise (such as value added tax and excise duties). However, a major review of the powers required by HMRC was announced at the time of the 2004 pre-budget report on 9 December 2004, covering the suitability of existing powers, new powers that might be required, and consolidating the existing compliance regimes for surcharges, interest, penalties and appeal, which may lead to a single, consolidated enforcement regime for all UK taxes, and a consultation document was published after the 2005 budget on 24 March 2005. Legislation to introduce new information and inspection powers was included in the Finance Act 2008 (Schedule 36). The new consolidated penalty regime was introduced via the Finance Act 2007 (Schedule 24).
As part of the spending review on 12 July 2004, Gordon Brown estimated that 12,500 jobs would be lost as result of the merger by March 2008, around 14% of the combined headcount of Customs (then around 23,000) and Inland Revenue (then around 68,000).  In addition, 2,500 staff would be redeployed to "front-line" activities.  Estimates suggested this may save around £300 million in staff costs, out of a total annual budget of £4 billion.

The total number of job losses included policy functions within the former Inland Revenue and Customs which moved into the Treasury, so that the Treasury became responsible for "strategy and tax policy development" and HMRC took responsibility for "policy maintenance". In addition, certain investigatory functions moved to the new Serious Organised Crime Agency, as well as prosecutions moving to the new Revenue and Customs Prosecution Office.

A further programme of job cuts and office closures was announced on 16 November 2006. Whilst some of the offices closed were in bigger cities where other offices already exist, many were in local, rural areas, where there is no other HMRC presence.  Initial proposals indicated that up to 200 offices would close and a further 12,500 jobs lost from 2008 to 2011.  In May 2009, staff morale in HMRC was the lowest of 11 government departments surveyed.

In 2013, HMRC began to introduce an update to the PAYE system, which meant it would receive information on tax and employee earnings from employers each month, rather than at the end of a tax year. A trial of the new system began in April 2012, and all employers switched by October 2013.

In 2012, Revenue Scotland was formed and on 1 April 2015 it took HMRC responsibility to collect devolved taxes in Scotland. In 2015 Welsh Revenue Authority was formed and on 1 April 2018 it took HMRC responsibility to collect devolved taxes in Wales.

On 12 November 2015, HMRC proposed to replace local offices with 13 regional centres by 2027.

Governance structure
The board is composed of members of the executive committee and non-executive directors. Its main role is to develop and approve HMRC’s overall strategy, approve final business plans and advise the chief executive on key appointments. It also performs an assurance role and advises on best practice.

The Treasury minister responsible for HMRC is the financial secretary to the Treasury, Victoria Atkins MP

Chairman 
The chairman of HMRC was an executive role until 2008. Mike Clasper served as a non-executive chairman. From August 2012, the post was abolished with a 'lead non-executive director' chairing board meetings instead.

 Sir David Varney April 2005– August 2006
 Paul Gray (acting) September 2006 – February 2007 and (confirmed) February 2007 – November 2007
 Dave Hartnett CB (acting) 2007– 31 July 2008
 Mike Clasper CBE 1 August 2008 – 1 August 2012

Chief Executive 
The chief executive is also the first permanent secretary for HMRC and the accounting officer.

 Dame Lesley Strathie 2008 – 2011
 Dame Lin Homer 2012 – 2016
 Sir Jon Thompson 2016 – 2019
Jim Harra 2019–present

Executive chair and permanent secretary
 Sir Edward Troup April 2016 – January 2018

Non-executive board members
Non-executive board members as of November 2019 are:

 Mervyn Walker (lead non-executive director)
Michael Hearty
Simon Ricketts
Alice Maynard
Juliette Scott
Paul Morton
Patricia Gallan

Personnel
 Permanent secretary
 Director general
 Director
 Deputy director
 Grade 6
 Grade 7
 Senior officer
 Higher officer
 Officer
 Assistant officer
 Administrative assistant
Source:

See civil service grading schemes for details.

Performance

HMRC collected £660 billion for the Treasury in 2018/19. It estimated that total theoretical tax liabilities in that year were £629 billion, but £31 billion was not collected due to the "tax gap", made up of money lost to tax evasion, tax avoidance, error and unpaid tax debts. This equates to a collection rate of 95.3% (up from 92.7% in 2005-6). At the end of March 2009, HMRC was managing 20 million 'open' cases (where the department’s systems identify discrepancies in taxpayer records or are unable to match a return to a record) which could affect around 4.5 million individuals who may have overpaid in total some £1.6 billion of tax and a further 1.5 million individuals who may have underpaid in total some £400 million of tax.

HMRC guidance notes that flexible arrangements can be made, where necessary, to assist individuals and businesses who have unpaid tax debts. Such "Time to Pay arrangements", for example an agreed monthly payment schedule, are based on the debtor's specific financial circumstances and the guidance notes that no "standard" Time to Pay arrangement exists. Interest is payable on a Time to Pay arrangement.

In 2007–08 HMRC overpaid tax credits to the value of £1 billion; at the end of March 2009, HMRC had £4.4 billion of overpayments to be recovered.

Controversies

Child benefit records misplacement

On 20 November 2007,  the Chancellor of the Exchequer, Alistair Darling, announced that two discs that held the personal details of all families in the United Kingdom claiming child benefit had gone missing. This is thought to affect approximately 25 million individuals and 7.5 million families in the UK. The missing discs include personal details such as name, date of birth, National Insurance number, and bank details.

The then chancellor stated that there was no indication that the details had fallen into criminal hands; however, he urged people to monitor their bank accounts.

IT problems
EDS ran the Inland Revenue's tax and National Insurance system
from 1994 to 2004. In 2003, the launch of a new tax credit system led to over-payments of £2 billion to over two million people. EDS later paid £71.25 million in compensation for the disaster. In 2004, the contract was awarded to Capgemini. This contract, also with Fujitsu and BT, was one of the biggest ever IT outsourcing contracts, at a value of £2.6 billion.

In February 2010, HMRC encountered problems following the implementation of their taxes modernisation program called Modernising Pay-as-you-Earn Processes for Customers (MPPC). The IT system was launched in June 2009 and its first real test came in a period known as annual coding. Annual coding issues certain codes to tax payers on a yearly basis. The annual coding process sent out incorrect tax coding notices to some taxpayers and their employers meaning that they would pay too much tax the following year.

Underpayments to ethnic minority claimants
In August 2010, seven HMRC staff were sacked for deliberately underpaying benefits to ethnic-minority claimants.  Dave Hartnett, permanent secretary for tax at HMRC, said the department operates a zero-tolerance policy on racial discrimination.

Goldman Sachs deal and surveillance of Osita Mba

The whistleblower Osita Mba revealed to The Guardian that HMRC entered a deal with Goldman Sachs which allowed Goldman Sachs to escape paying £10 million interest on unpaid tax. Following this HMRC used powers under the Regulation of Investigatory Powers Act (RIPA) "to examine the belongings, emails, internet search records and phone calls of their own solicitor, Osita Mba, and the phone records of his then wife" to find if he had spoken to the investigations editor of The Guardian, David Leigh.

MPs in the House of Commons public accounts committee praised Osita Mba and called for scrutiny into HMRC's use of RIPA powers in a report. The report said: "We are deeply disappointed by HMRC's handling of whistleblowers. We consider that HMRC's use of powers reserved for tackling serious criminals against Mr Osita Mba was indefensible. HMRC told us that it had changed how it deals with whistleblowers and that it now provides information to its audit and risk committee who can use this to challenge how HMRC handles whistleblowers."

Call waiting times
In September 2015, a report from Citizens Advice highlighted frustration amongst callers to HMRC over long holding times. The report claimed that "thousands" of callers were waiting on average 47 minutes to have their call answered, often at considerable expense to the caller. HMRC alleged that the "unscientific and out-of-date survey of tweets" did "not represent the real picture" but said that 3000 extra staff had been taken on to respond to calls. A June 2015 report from the National Audit Office indicated that the total number of calls answered by HMRC fell from 79% in 2013–14, to 72.5% in 2014–15, however a subsequent report in May 2016 suggested that performance improved following the recruitment drive.

Revenue and Customs Digital Technology Services
Revenue and Customs Digital Technology Services (RCDTS) is a subsidiary of HMRC established in 2015 to provide technical and digital services. The company works exclusively for HMRC and its employees are not civil servants. On 17 January 2022, HMRC announced its intention to wind up the company.

See also
 HM Revenue and Customs Museum
 Government Offices Great George Street
 Revenue Scotland
 Tŷ William Morgan - William Morgan House
 Welsh Revenue Authority

References

External links

Commissioners for Revenue and Customs Act 2005
Treasury Press Release (25 November 2004)
HMRC criticised for using terror laws against tax whistleblower The Guardian, 2014
Government must revisit the 2019 Loan Charge to avoid bankrupting thousands of innocent contractors Politics Home, 2018
Mental health problems can be 'exacerbated' by HMRC demands, experts say The Telegraph, 2018
MP targets 'immoral' HMRC over 'retrospective' taxation of contractors The Telegraph, 2018
Please only be suicidal during office hours, say HMRC, to workers facing bankruptcy Business Matters, 2018

 
Customs services
Government agencies established in 2005
National law enforcement agencies of the United Kingdom
Non-ministerial departments of the Government of the United Kingdom
Taxation in the United Kingdom
2005 establishments in the United Kingdom
Revenue services